Kulbhushan is a masculine Indian given name. Notable people with the name include:

 Kulbhushan Jadhav (born 1970), Indian national convicted of terrorism and spying in Pakistan
 Kulbhushan Kharbanda (born 1944), Indian film actor

Indian masculine given names